Joe Jonas & Jay Sean: Live in Concert was a co-headlining tour by American recording artist Joe Jonas and British recording artist Jay Sean. Predominately visiting North America, the tour played 19 concerts in the fall of 2011.

Background
The tour was announced in August 2011. In a press release announcing the tour, both artists expressed excitement at the concept of touring with the other. Jonas stated, "This is going to be a killer tour and who better to hit the road with than Jay Sean". Sean reiterated the sentiment, saying "I'm super excited to be on the road with Joe and I think it's going to be a great experience for me."

The tour was originally 18+, however, the restrictions were later lifted.

Opening act
JoJo

Setlist

Tour dates

Cancellations and rescheduled shows

Box office score data

External links
Jay Sean Official Website
Joe Jonas Official Website

References

2011 concert tours
Co-headlining concert tours